The 1915 Mississippi gubernatorial election took place on November 2, 1915, in order to elect the Governor of Mississippi. Incumbent Democrat Earl L. Brewer was term-limited, and could not run for reelection to a second term. As was common at the time, the Democratic candidate won in a landslide in the general election so therefore the Democratic primary was the real contest, and winning the primary was considered tantamount to election.

Democratic primary
In the Democratic primary, Lieutenant Governor Theodore G. Bilbo received just over 50% of the vote, eliminating the need for a runoff. He defeated 4 other candidates to win the nomination.

Results

General election
In the general election, Bilbo easily defeated Socialist candidate J. T. Lester.

Results

References

1915
gubernatorial
Mississippi
November 1915 events